The  or  (plural:  or ) is a siren or nereid-like creature in Basque mythology. They are depicted as beautiful, long-haired women with webbed duck feet, usually found at the river shore combing their hair with a golden comb and charming men. 

Mythology in coastal areas includes , a variety of lamiak who live in the sea and have fish-like tails, similar to a mermaid.

Beliefs
In Basque mythology,  are described as helping those who give them presents by providing them with help at work. For example, if a farmer were to leave food for them at the river shore, they would eat it at night and in exchange finish ploughing his field. In some places, bridges were believed to have been built at night by : Ebrain (Bidarray, Lower Navarre), Azalain (Andoain, Gipuzkoa), Urkulu (Leintz-Gatzaga, Gipuzkoa), Liginaga-Astüe (Labourd).

In other myths,  must leave if the bridge that they were building at night was left unfinished at cockcrow. People believed that k had left a river if a stone in the bridge was missing. Other beliefs claim that most  disappeared when men built small churches in the forest.

 are also believed to be the other side of the rainbow, where they are combing their hair. It is said that when the sunlight strikes their hair, the rainbow opens.

Mythology also occasionally describes male . In those stories, they are described as strong and are attributed with the creation of dolmens at night. It is also said that they can enter a house at night when its inhabitants are sleeping.

See also
Basajaun
Sorginak
Mari

References

Basque legendary creatures
Basque mythology
Female legendary creatures
Mythological human hybrids
Water spirits